Sikhism in Austria is a very small religious minority. There are about 9,000 Sikhs in Austria.  As of 2012 there were three gurdwaras in Austria.

In 2009, Ravidassia-sect  leader Ramanand Dass was murdered by religious opponents in Vienna. As per Austrian government, Sikhism is now an official religion. The local Sikh population of Austria can now use Singh and Kaur as their last name.

Further reading

https://www.tribuneindia.com/news/diaspora/registration-of-sikhism-in-austria-a-milestone-sgpc-190803

References

External links
 https://www.tribuneindia.com/news/diaspora/registration-of-sikhism-in-austria-a-milestone-sgpc-190803